The following is a list of hospitals, hospital support services and palliative care centres in Western Australia. Medical facilities in Western Australia are either run by the State's Department of Health, the Commonwealth, or private institutions of non-government organisations.

Metropolitan hospital services

Rural hospital services

Hospital support services

Palliative care

Closed hospitals

References
 Department of Health Hospital Services

 
Western Australia
Hospitals